Bethenny Frankel (born November 4, 1970) is an American businesswoman, television personality, entrepreneur, and author. She starred in the Bravo television series The Real Housewives of New York City, appearing in eight of its thirteen seasons since its 2008 premiere. In 2009, she founded the lifestyle brand, Skinnygirl. 

Prior to this, she was the runner-up on the NBC reality competition series The Apprentice: Martha Stewart in 2005. She has gone on to headline several series of her own: the Bravo spin-offs Bethenny Ever After (2010–2012) and Bethenny & Fredrik (2018), the FOX daytime talk show Bethenny (2013–2014), and the HBO Max reality competition series The Big Shot with Bethenny (2021).

Outside of her work in reality television, Frankel is the founder of the Skinnygirl, a lifestyle brand, and BStrong, a disaster relief initiative. She is also the author of four self-help books.

Early life 
Frankel is the only child of Robert J. Frankel, a horse trainer, and Bernadette Birk, an interior designer. Her father was German-Jewish, whereas her mother was a Roman Catholic of Welsh descent. Her father left her mother when Frankel was four years old. When she was five, her mother married horse trainer John Parisella, who is Italian and of the Roman Catholic faith. Frankel describes her childhood as difficult. Her mother, Frankel says, "was always drinking" and often argued violently with her stepfather.

Frankel considers herself Jewish and has spoken against the rise of antisemitism, stating "I have a last name that's Jewish. I have family that's Jewish. I am Jewish" on her Just B with Bethenny Frankel podcast.

Frankel said she moved many times and attended multiple schools before going to boarding school. Frankel attended Catholic schools as a girl, and she graduated in 1988 from the Pine Crest School in Fort Lauderdale, Florida, where she lived on campus. She attended the Natural Gourmet Institute in New York City, Boston University for two years, and graduated with a degree in psychology and communications from New York University.

Career

Early career and television 
In 1992, Frankel moved to Los Angeles with hopes of being an actress. While she landed some small acting roles, she worked as a nanny to Paris Hilton and a personal assistant to Jerry Bruckheimer and Linda Bruckheimer. During this time, Frankel also worked as a production assistant on the set of Saved by the Bell. Frankel used these connections to start her first company, called "In Any Event", a party-planning business, which was short-lived. Her next entrepreneurial enterprise was re-selling pashmina scarves that she bought wholesale from an Indian manufacturer.

In 2003, Frankel started a baking business called "BethennyBakes", focusing on "healthy" cookies and meal delivery in New York City, which was featured on The Apprentice: Martha Stewart, a reality competition series, in 2005. Frankel was one of two finalists on The Apprentice: Martha Stewart. The company, BethennyBakes, later went out of business in 2006, but Frankel remained a spokesperson for Pepperidge Farms low-calorie line.

In 2008, Frankel began starring in the reality television series The Real Housewives of New York City, which premiered in March on Bravo. In June 2010, Frankel appeared in the Bravo reality series Bethenny Getting Married? (later retitled Bethenny Ever After), which documented her engagement and marriage to Jason Hoppy as well as the birth of their daughter. The series premiere became Bravo's highest-rated one at the time, garnering 2.1 million viewers. In September 2010, Frankel announced her exit from The Real Housewives of New York City following its third season. In November, she competed in the reality competition series Skating with the Stars and finished in second place.

Frankel taped the pilot of a potential talk show in June 2011. The syndicated daytime talk show, eponymously titled Bethenny, premiered in September 2013. It was cancelled in February 2014 after one season. Frankel rejoined The Real Housewives of New York City as a cast member for its seventh season, which premiered in April 2015. In March 2019, Deadline Hollywood reported that Frankel had signed a deal with MGM Television and the company's chairman, Mark Burnett, to produce and star in future unscripted television projects. In June 2021, Frankel announced she no longer had a deal with MGM Television. In August of the same year, she announced her departure from The Real Housewives of New York City. Some of her most notable phrases on the show that the Bravo Network recognized, and ultimately capitalized on, include: "Get off my jock", "Go to sleep! GO TO SLEEP!", "Life is not a Cabaret!"  and "Mention it all!" while simultaneously opening her legs during an argument with fellow castmate Ramona Singer. In 2021, Frankel starred in the HBO Max reality competition series titled The Big Shot with Bethenny, which she also produced alongside Burnett. The series features "aspiring business moguls compete for a job on Frankel's executive team."

In 2011, she appeared on the cover of Forbes magazine.

In 2022, the Jewish Journal named Frankel one of "The Top 10 Jewish Reality TV Stars of All Time."

Skinnygirl 
In March 2009, Frankel's book, Naturally Thin: Unleash Your SkinnyGirl and Free Yourself from a Lifetime of Dieting, was published and The SkinnyGirl Dish: Easy Recipes for Your Naturally Thin Life, was published in December. She created an exercise DVD, Body by Bethenny, in spring 2010 and an audiobook, The Skinnygirl Rules, which summarized her two prior books. In 2011, Frankel published, A Place of Yes: 10 Rules for Getting Everything You Want Out of Life and in December 2012, published the novel Skinnydipping.

Frankel created a pre-packaged margarita line, named Skinnygirl Margarita, in 2009, which led to Frankel founding the company Skinnygirl and the cocktail line, Skinnygirl Cocktails. The company has since created products such as "candy, deli meat, sweeteners, popcorn, salad dressings, shapewear, and most recently, jeans and apparel." She sold the cocktail line to Beam Global for $120 million in 2011.

Philanthropy and activism 
Frankel is the founder of BStrong, a disaster relief organization. In 2017, the organization raised $300,000 in donations and supplies for the victims of Hurricane Harvey, after which Frankel visited Houston, Texas to distribute these items. In the same year, Frankel traveled to Mexico City and Jojutla, Mexico following the Puebla earthquake to raise awareness for the disaster's recovery efforts, for which BStrong also raised $150,000. Also in the same year, Frankel chartered four planes to Puerto Rico and distributed medical supplies, food, water, and hygiene products in assisting with Hurricane Maria relief efforts. In light of the COVID-19 pandemic, BStrong raised funds and delivered personal protective equipment such as masks, goggles, gowns, and sheets to hospitals in the U.S. In February 2022, BStrong began fundraising to support Ukrainians during the 2022 Russian invasion of Ukraine. By March 5, 2022, BStrong had raised $25 million, with Frankel saying "$10 million has been allocated to help relocate refugees, while another $15 million was earmarked for distribution inside Ukraine". As of current, BStrong has raised over $125 million for the Ukraine conflict.

Frankel posed nude for a PETA billboard in September 2009.

During the full-scale Russian invasion of Ukraine, which is part of Russian-Ukrainian war, supported Ukraine with humanitarian aid.

Personal life 
Frankel was married to entertainment executive Peter Sussman from 1996 to 1997.

In March 2010 she married pharmaceutical sales executive Jason Hoppy. They have one daughter, Bryn. After the couple separated in December 2012, Frankel filed for divorce in January 2013. A custody agreement was finalized in June 2014, followed by a financial settlement in July 2016. Frankel and Hoppy's divorce was finalized in January 2021. She is engaged to film producer Paul Bernon.

Frankel has a severe fish allergy and was hospitalized in December 2018 after consuming soup that contained fish. She has since advocated airlines stop serving fish, stating that it is a hazard to passengers with fish allergies to be in the presence of cooked seafood in an enclosed commercial airline jet.

Filmography

As herself

As actress

Bibliography 
 Naturally Thin: Unleash Your SkinnyGirl and Free Yourself from a Lifetime of Dieting (2009)
 The Skinnygirl Dish: Easy Recipes for Your Naturally Thin Life (2009)
 Body by Bethenny: Body-sculpting Workouts to Unleash Your SkinnyGirl (2010)
 A Place of Yes: 10 Rules for Getting Everything You Want Out of Life (2011)
 Skinnydipping: A Novel (2012)
 Skinnygirl Solutions: Simple Ideas, Extraordinary Results (2014)
 Cookie Meets Peanut (2014)
 Skinnygirl Cocktails : 100 Fabulous and Flirty Cocktail Recipes and Party Foods for Any Occasion, Without the Guilt (2014)
 I Suck at Relationships So You Don't Have To: 10 Rules for Not Screwing Up Your Happily Ever After (2016)

References

External links 

 
 

1970 births
American chefs
American people of Jewish descent
American people of Welsh descent
American socialites
American television talk show hosts
American women writers
Living people
New York University alumni
The Real Housewives cast members
Television personalities from New York City
21st-century American women
Pine Crest School alumni